ivansxtc is a 2000 British-American independent drama film co-written by Bernard Rose and Lisa Enos, produced by Enos and directed by Rose, the first of several Enos-Rose collaborations, including Snuff-Movie (2005), Kreutzer Sonata (2008) and Mr. Nice (2010). The film stars Danny Huston, Peter Weller, and Lisa Enos, with Rose and Enos' actual CAA agent, Adam Krentzmen, playing the role of fictional "Media Talent Agency" agent Barry Oaks. Other key roles include Morgan Walsh (Vukovic) as Lucy Lawrence, and SLC Punk director James Merendino as director Danny McTeague.

The story follows a Hollywood agent, Ivan Beckman (Huston), who must force a smile and carry on with business as usual with the agency's biggest client, Don West (Weller), in the face of a cancer diagnosis. The film, loosely based on Leo Tolstoy's 1886 novella The Death of Ivan Ilyich, was also inspired by the rise and fall of talent agent Jay Moloney.

Cast
 Danny Huston as Ivan Beckman, a successful film agent working in Los Angeles
 Peter Weller as Don West, Beckman's client
 Lisa Enos as Charlotte White
 James Merendino as Danny McTeague
 Adam Krentzman as Barry Oaks
 Sarah Danielle Madison as Naomi
 Tiffani Thiessen as Marie Stein
 Dan Ireland as Ted Zimblest
 Lisa Henson as Margaret Mead
 Hal Lieberman as Lloyd Hall
 Valeria Golino as Constanza Vero
 Angela Featherstone as Amanda Hill
 Victoria Silvstedt as Melanie

Production
Filming took place in July 1999 in Sherman Oaks and Los Angeles, and was originally intended as a "Dogme 95"  film in which the key collaborators (Enos, Rose, DP Ron Forstye, Production Coordinator Morgan Vukovic, etc.) would be credited as "The Filmmakers". It was shot at 60i fps on the Sony HDW-700A HD video format digital camera, which proved problematic for theatrical distribution.

Release
On its opening weekend in the United States and Canada, the film was ranked at #71, behind The Salton Sea, The Singles Ward and a re-release of Beauty and the Beast.

Reception
Ivans Xtc received mostly positive reviews. On film aggregation website Rotten Tomatoes, it holds a 77% rating, with an average score of 6.8/10, sampled from reviews from 30 critics. It scored a 67/100 (citing "generally favorable reviews") on Metacritic, based on reviews from 14 critics.

Accolades

References

External links

Films based on works by Leo Tolstoy
Films based on Russian novels
2000 films
British independent films
American independent films
2000 drama films
Films directed by Bernard Rose (director)
Films about death
Films with screenplays by Bernard Rose (director)
2000 independent films
2000s English-language films
2000s American films
2000s British films
Rhino Films films